Sergey Ivanovich Mashnin (born May 4, 1967) is a professional association football manager from Russia and a former Soviet player. 

Mashnin played in the Russian First Division with FC Metallurg Lipetsk.

External links
Profile at Footballfacts.ru

1967 births
Living people
Soviet footballers
Russian footballers
Association football midfielders
Russian football managers
FC Lokomotiv Moscow players
FC Dynamo Barnaul players
FC Tobol Kurgan players
FC Spartak Tambov players
FC Metallurg Lipetsk players
FC Metallurg Lipetsk managers